Wigston College, previously known as Guthlaxton College, is a coeducational sixth form located in Wigston Magna in the English county of Leicestershire. The college forms part of The Wigston Academies Trust, together with neighbouring Wigston Academy.

History
It was established as Guthlaxton Grammar School in 1954. The school became Guthlaxton College after comprehensive education was introduced to Leicestershire. The name Guthlaxton came from the Guthlaxton hundred of Leicestershire. In September 2015 the school changed its name to Wigston College to reflect the merger of neighbouring Bushloe High School and Abington Academy into Wigston Academy, a sister school on the same site and part of the same academy trust. In 2016 Wigston Academy took over responsibility for delivering 14-16 education and Wigston College became solely a sixth form, with the final cohort of Year 11 students to study at Wigston College leaving in 2017.

Academics
Wigston College offers  a range of A Levels and further BTECs. The college specialises in performing arts and has dedicated facilities to support the specialism.

Headteachers 
 Mr Martin J. Olivier 1954 - 
 Mr Robert Dunn (Acting Headmaster following death of M J Olivier) 
 Mr Cyril Harris
 Rev. Arthur Watthey
Mr Graham Norris 1981 - 1995 
 Mr Michael Fields 1995 - 2008
 Mr John Keller 2008 - 2014
Miss Sally Cox 2014 - 2016
Mr Michael Wilson 2016 -

Executive Headteachers/CEO

 Mr Alex Green 2015 - 2016
 Mr Mark Mitchley 2016 -

Notable former pupils

Guthlaxton Grammar School
Adrian Juste,  disc jockey and radio presenter
Andrew Nunn,  Church of England Cathedral Dean

Guthlaxton College
Hamza Choudhury, footballer who currently plays for Leicester City
Brett Deacon, rugby union player, mostly played for Leicester Tigers
Harry Panayiotou, footballer who currently plays for Aittitos Spata

References

External links
Wigston College official website

Educational institutions established in 1954
1954 establishments in England
Academies in Leicestershire
Education in Leicestershire